The  team relay luge at the 2016 Winter Youth  Olympics took place on 16 February at the Lillehammer Olympic Bobsleigh and Luge Track.

Results

References

External links
Results
 

Luge at the 2016 Winter Youth Olympics